The Bootleg Series Vol. 11: The Basement Tapes Complete is a compilation album of unreleased home recordings made in 1967 by Bob Dylan and the group of musicians that would become the Band, released on November 3, 2014 on Legacy Records. It is the ninth installment of the Bob Dylan Bootleg Series, available as a six-disc complete set, and as a separate set of highlights – in a two-disc format common to the rest of the series – entitled The Basement Tapes Raw.

Revered for decades as the "holy grail" for music collectors and Dylan fans, the recordings have been notoriously bootlegged by collectors in various forms throughout the years, some of which were included on what is arguably the first rock bootleg album ever, Great White Wonder, released in July 1969. The Basement Tapes Complete is the first time the complete sessions, containing 138 tracks of which 117 were not previously issued, have been officially released. Of these tracks 23 are alternate takes, making 115 distinct songs in the set of which some heard in two or three different takes. The Basement Tapes Complete was universally acclaimed upon release by critics and fans alike, and went on to win Best Historical Album at the 58th Annual Grammy Awards.

The liner notes for The Bootleg Series Vol. 11 are by Sid Griffin, American musician and author of Million Dollar Bash: Bob Dylan, The Band, and The Basement Tapes.

History of recordings

The basement recordings were made during 1967, after Dylan had withdrawn to his Woodstock home in the aftermath of a motorcycle accident on July 29, 1966. Recording sessions began in a den known as "The Red Room" in Dylan's home, before moving to an improvised recording studio in the basement of a house known as Big Pink, where Rick Danko, Richard Manuel and Garth Hudson lived. The sessions lasted roughly from May to October 1967. In October 1967, a fourteen-song demo tape was copyrighted and the compositions were registered with Dwarf Music, a publishing company jointly owned by Dylan and his manager Albert Grossman. Acetates and tapes of the songs then circulated among interested recording artists. Dylan has referred to commercial pressures behind the basement recordings in a 1969 interview with Rolling Stone: "They weren't demos for myself, they were demos of the songs. I was being PUSHED again into coming up with some songs. You know how those things go."

Peter, Paul and Mary had the first hit with a basement composition when their cover of "Too Much of Nothing" reached number 35 on the Billboard chart in late 1967. Ian & Sylvia, also managed by Grossman, recorded "Tears of Rage", "Quinn the Eskimo" and "This Wheel's on Fire". In January 1968, Manfred Mann reached number one on the UK singles chart with their recording of "The Mighty Quinn". In April, "This Wheel's on Fire", recorded by Julie Driscoll, Brian Auger and the Trinity, hit number five on the UK chart. That same month, a version of "You Ain't Goin' Nowhere" by the Byrds was issued as a single. Along with "Nothing Was Delivered", it appeared on their country-rock album Sweetheart of the Rodeo, released in August. The Hawks, officially renamed the Band, recorded "This Wheel's on Fire", "I Shall Be Released" and "Tears of Rage" for their debut album, Music from Big Pink, released in July 1968. Fairport Convention covered "Million Dollar Bash" on their 1969 album Unhalfbricking.

In July 1969, the first rock bootleg appeared in California, entitled Great White Wonder. The double album consisted of seven songs from the Woodstock basement sessions, plus some early recordings Dylan had made in Minneapolis in December 1961 and one track recorded from The Johnny Cash Show. One of those responsible for the bootleg, identified only as Patrick, talked to Rolling Stone: "Dylan is a heavy talent and he's got all those songs nobody's ever heard. We thought we'd take it upon ourselves to make this music available." The process of bootlegging Dylan's work would eventually see the illegal release of hundreds of live and studio recordings, and lead the Recording Industry Association of America to describe Dylan as the most bootlegged artist in the history of the music industry.

The basement recordings became the basis for Dylan's 1975 official release The Basement Tapes. This album was criticised by Dylan critic Michael Gray because it contained recordings by the Band on their own, and because important Dylan songs were omitted from the selection. Subsequent to the official 1975 release, more than 100 recordings from the Basement Tapes began to circulate in bootleg form, catalogued by Greil Marcus in his book Invisible Republic: Bob Dylan's Basement Tapes (1997), and by Sid Griffin in Million Dollar Bash: Bob Dylan, the Band, and the Basement Tapes (2007).

The Bootleg Series Vol. 11: The Basement Tapes Complete presents the original recordings, and places them in roughly chronological order. The original reel-to-reel tapes were in the possession of Garth Hudson, organist for the Hawks.  He brought them to fellow-Canadians, Jan Haust and Peter J. Moore who restored and digitized them for this release. Their work led them to be nominated in 2016 for a Grammy award for Best Historical Album.

Reception

The Bootleg Series Vol. 11: The Basement Tapes Complete received unanimously positive reviews from critics. The critical aggregator website Metacritic awarded The Basement Tapes Complete a Metascore of 99, based on reviews by 18 critics, indicating "universal acclaim".

Writing for AllMusic, Stephen Thomas Erlewine gave it five out of five stars, writing, "This is the wondrous thing about The Basement Tapes: this is music made with no expectation that anybody outside of a small circle would ever hear it."  Paste magazine rated the album ten out of ten, and called it "some of the most daring, creative and truly beautiful music ever recorded".

In his review for American Songwriter, Jim Beviglia gave it five out of five stars and wrote:

 
Discussing the song "I'm Not There", Jesse Jarnow said that "Here and everywhere, underscored by the newest remix, The Basement Tapes are almost purely beautiful — a characteristic not often associated with Dylan’s music."

Not all critics, however, were entirely pleased with the overwhelming completeness of the album, and considered a large amount of the album consisted of throwaway songs that were never meant to be heard. In his review for The New Yorker magazine, Sasha Frere-Jones wrote, "Historically, these sessions have been treated with awe, as if something essential about both Dylan and popular song can be found on the tapes. That's at best half true. The performances weren't approached with any kind of gravity, and are best listened to with no reverence at all. For every moment of revelation and synthesis, there are five throwaways."

Track listing

The Basement Tapes Complete
All songs written by Bob Dylan except where noted; traditional songs arranged by Dylan.

The Basement Tapes Raw

Personnel
Bob Dylan – acoustic guitar, harmonica, piano, vocals
Rick Danko – bass guitar, vocals
Garth Hudson – organ
Richard Manuel – piano, drums, vocals
Robbie Robertson – electric guitar, drums, vocals
Levon Helm – drums, vocals (select tracks, unknown)

See also
Lost on the River: The New Basement Tapes
List of Basement Tapes songs

Notes

Footnotes

References

External links
 BobDylan.com  – Official web site, including lyrics and touring schedule.
 Bob Dylan 1967 recording sessions at Olof Björner's website.

2014 compilation albums
Bob Dylan compilation albums
The Band compilation albums
Columbia Records compilation albums
Demo albums